José Carlos Cota Osuna (born 16 March 1946) is a Mexican politician affiliated with the Institutional Revolutionary Party. As of 2014 he served as Senator of the LVIII and LIX Legislatures of the Mexican Congress representing Baja California Sur and as Deputy of the LVII Legislature. He previously served in the Congress of Baja California Sur from 1990 to 1993.

References

1946 births
Living people
People from La Paz, Baja California Sur
Members of the Senate of the Republic (Mexico)
Members of the Chamber of Deputies (Mexico)
Institutional Revolutionary Party politicians
21st-century Mexican politicians
Instituto Politécnico Nacional alumni
Politicians from Baja California Sur
Members of the Congress of Baja California Sur
20th-century Mexican politicians